Alleyona Canedo da Silva (born 6 November 1969), known professionally as Leona Cavalli, is a Brazilian actress and stage director.

Biography 

Her father politician, lawyer and poet and teacher mother's name, has three brothers. At birth, was named Alleyona. Her mother wanted it to be Leona, but the father thought the name too strong for a baby and decided to adapt - it. Cavalli comes from their sponsors.

Her childhood was in nature, playing fields by the gauchos, where the horse ran, climbed trees, swam praticaca and many other sports. With her father, who was twice mayor of the city, learned early to live with a lot of people climbing on the stump, attending rallies without bothering to be the daughter of a public person alive. With his mother, learned to appreciate the beauty and love freedom.

At age ten she was traveling, had boyfriends and wanted to be an actress.

she participated in several parts as, A Divina Sarah, As Lágrimas Amargas de Petra Von Kant, Brincando em cima Daquilo, O Homem e o Cavalo, etc.

Then came the UFRGS, in the course of Performing Arts and the PUC, in the course of law. But, dropped everything and went to St. Paul in an attempt to do theater professionally.

Participated in several films such as, Um Céu de Estrelas, Amarelo Manga, Carandiru, Olga, Antônia, Aparecida - O Milagre, etc.

Is also participated in several telenovelas and miniseries as, Da Cor do Pecado, Começar de Novo, Belíssima, Bang Bang, the miniseries Amazônia, de Galvez a Chico Mendes, Duas Caras, Negócio da China, etc. Leona participated in an episode of Casos e Acasos (Globo).

Leona in 2010, participates in the miniseries Dalva e Herivelto portraying the character Margot, and is also in the theater with the monologue "Máscaras de Penas Penadas". In 2010, he participated in an episode of As Cariocas and A Vida Alheia, series aired by Globo, As well as appearing in the feature film Os Inquilinos.

In 2011, she made a cameo on the soap opera, Araguaia. Currently, this air, soap opera, A Vida da Gente as Dra. Celina. In 2012, made an appearance in the series As Brasileiras, in the episode A Justiceira de Olinda.

Zarolha plays the character in the remake of the telenovela Gabriela. In 2013 will be in the soap opera Amor à Vida of Walcyr Carrasco, the plot she interprets the medical Glauce.

Filmography

Television

Film

References

External links 

1969 births
Living people
People from Rio Grande do Sul
Brazilian television actresses
Brazilian telenovela actresses
Brazilian film actresses
Brazilian stage actresses
Federal University of Rio Grande do Sul alumni
Pontifical Catholic University of Rio Grande do Sul alumni